Hemendranath Majumdar (1894–1948) was an Indian painter. In 2002, there was a huge uproar when his painting was stolen and found with an art dealer.

Early life
Hemen Majumdar was born in Kishoreganj in British India (now in Bangladesh).

In 1910, he joined The Government School of Art in Calcutta (now Government College of Art & Craft Kolkata), and from 1911 to 1915 studied at Jubilee Art School, Calcutta.

Career
Hemen Majumdar painted the gates to welcome King George V, on his visit to India in 1911.

In 1919, he founded Indian Academy of Fine Art in Calcutta along with Jogeshchandra Seal, Jamini Roy, Bhabani Charan Laha and Atul Bose.

He also published a journal, Shilpi, with A.C. Mukhopadhyay.

Works
 Cure of all Ills - Painted Mahatma Gandhi spinning thread
 Kaner - Dul - Earring

Awards
 1921-22 First Prize, Bombay Art Exhibition, Bombay

References

External links
 Profile on Kumar Art Gallery 

Indian male painters
Government College of Art & Craft alumni
University of Calcutta alumni
1948 deaths
1894 births
20th-century Indian painters
Artists from Kolkata
Painters from West Bengal
20th-century Indian male artists